Apple Inc. has produced and sold headphones since 2001, available for standalone purchase and bundled with iPhone (until 2020) and iPod (until 2022) products. Apple's current product line consists of EarPods (wired earbuds available with a 3.5mm headphone or Lightning connector), AirPods and AirPods Pro (wireless Bluetooth earbuds), and AirPods Max (wireless Bluetooth over-ear headphones).

Wired headphones

Classic round earbuds

Apple's original earbuds shipped with the original iPod, released on October 23, 2001. They were never given a formal name and were referred to variously as "iPod headphones" and "the iPod's earbud-style headphones". They were bundled with two pairs of foam covers. The second generation added a plastic slider to allow the user to limit the gap between the wires. The third generation were redesigned with a slightly longer strain relief, a slightly smaller speaker grill, and the left/right marking being moved from the outside to the inside.

iPhone Stereo Headset 
The iPhone Stereo Headset was introduced in 2007 and was bundled with the original iPhone and iPhone 3G, and featured a control capsule in-line with the right earbud's wire with a microphone and a single button, actuated by squeezing the unit, which can be programmed to control calls, presentations, music and video playback, launch Siri, or take pictures with the Camera application. There was also an version without the microphone that was more rare. There have been many reports of moisture problems with the remote/mic.

iPod In-Ear Headphones 
iPod In-Ear Headphones were introduced in January 2004 as premium headphones compared to those bundled with iPods, and were available for $39. They included three different sized plastic caps, and Apple claimed improved sound quality and bass response. They were discontinued in 2008.

Apple Earphones with Remote and Mic 
Apple Earphones with Remote and Mic were introduced in 2009 and were bundled with the iPhone 3GS, iPhone 4, iPhone 4S, the third-generation iPod Touch, and sold independently. They expanded on the iPhone Stereo Headset by adding two other buttons dedicated to volume control. A variant without a microphone shipped only with the third-generation iPod shuffle.

Apple In-Ear Headphone 
Apple In-Ear Headphones were introduced on September 9, 2008, intended as a premium option compared to Apple's bundled earbuds. Like the regular earbuds they have a remote control and microphone built-in. They add silicone ear tips and dual drivers advertised as "engineered for superior acoustic accuracy, balance, and clarity". The remote and protective case was redesigned on September 12, 2012, with the remote matching that of EarPods. Apple has since removed them from their online store.

EarPods 

EarPods were introduced on September 12, 2012 and feature a redesign with no silicone tips, less visible metal, and a plastic outer shell. They first shipped with the iPhone 5 and feature a remote control and microphone. They also shipped with the iPod Touch (5th generation) and iPod Nano (7th generation) without a remote and microphone. EarPods are also individually sold with a carrying case, while the version bundled with the iPod Touch (5th generation), iPod Touch (6th generation) and iPod Nano (7th generation) only have basic biodegradable packaging, due to their lack of a remote and mic. A microphone icon was added on the previously unmarked back side of the control capsule on EarPods with a microphone. They are compatible with iPhones from the iPhone 3GS to iPhone 6S, the iPod Touch (2nd generation) and onwards, and all models of the iPad, iPad mini, and iPad Pro, except the third and  
fourth generation iPad Pro. They require iOS 2.2 and onwards for iOS devices but are not compatible with the original iPhone, iPhone 3G, or iPod Touch (1st generation) due to sound problems. They are also compatible with most Android devices and computers.

A second iteration, "EarPods with Lightning Connector", were introduced in 2016 along with the iPhone 7 and replaced the 3.5mm headphone jack with a Lighting connector. They work with all devices that have a Lightning port and support iOS 10 or later. The previous EarPods were rebranded as "EarPods with 3.5mm Headphone Plug". Since early 2017, both products now lack a carrying case, instead being sold in recyclable cardboard packaging.

Following the release of the iPhone 12 series in 2020, EarPods are no longer bundled with iPhones in most countries except where required by law. Following the discontinuation of the iPod line in 2022, EarPods are only available as a standalone purchase.

Lightning to 3.5mm dongle 

iPhone models from the iPhone 7 to the iPhone X also shipped with a Lightning-to-3.5mm headphone jack adapter, enabling customers to connect 3.5mm headphones to a Lightning port. Thanks to an iOS update (iOS 10.3), it is backwards compatible, meaning it can be used with any previous device with a Lightning port (from iPhone 5 onwards). It is no longer included as of the iPhone XS and iPhone XR, but remains available for purchase from Apple and third-party retailers.

Wireless headphones

iPhone Bluetooth Headset

The iPhone Bluetooth Headset was introduced in 2007, priced at $129 and later reduced to $99, and discontinued in 2009. It was designed for phone calls only and could not be used for listening to music. It was bundled with a "Travel Cable" that charged it and a 30-pin iPhone simultaneously, and a docking station called the iPhone Dual Dock that could charge it and an original iPhone was also available.

AirPods 

AirPods were announced alongside the iPhone 7 and were released on December 16, 2016. They are wireless earbud-style headphones with microphones, dual accelerometers, IR sensors used to pause music if they are not in the user's ears, and motion touch sensors that are used to activate controls. They are advertised as having a battery life of five hours, and come with a charging case that gives them a total of 24 hours of battery life. The original case is charged by Lightning, and in 2019 a second case was introduced with Qi charging. AirPods are compatible with iPhones, iPads, Apple Watches, Macs, the 6th generation iPod Touch, and the 7th generation iPod Nano, but automatic pairing with an iCloud account requires macOS Sierra, iOS 10, and watchOS. They are also compatible with devices on other platforms that support Bluetooth, but it limits the AirPods' functionality.

AirPods Pro

AirPods Pro were released on October 30, 2019 as a premium option compared to AirPods. They use the same H1 chip found in second generation AirPods, and boast a slimmer design, active noise cancellation, adaptive EQ, IPX4 water resistance, a new charging case with Qi standard, and include silicone tips.

AirPods Max

AirPods Max, released on December 15, 2020, are wireless Bluetooth over-ear headphones. They feature two H1 chips, active noise cancellation and transparency mode, a Digital Crown and on-head detection.

In popular culture

Apple's white earbuds are prominently featured in the majority of their distinctive "silhouette style" iPod advertisements. Most often as a dancing black figure in [silhouette] with a starkly contrasted white earbuds and cord while holding a white iPod. The background is usually another bright colour so the iPod and headphones clearly stand out compared to the rest of the image.

See also 

 Timeline of Apple Inc. products
 Apple speakers

References 

Apple Inc. peripherals
IPod accessories
IPhone accessories